Jack Metcalf may refer to:

Jack Metcalf (footballer) (born 1991), English footballer
Jack Metcalf (rugby league) (1919–2007), Australian rugby league footballer
Jack Metcalf (politician) (1927–2007), American politician

See also
Jack Metcalfe (1912-1994), Australian track and field athlete
John Metcalf (civil engineer) (1717-1810), British road builder, also known as "Blind Jack Metcalf"